Lakhipur is a town and sub-divisional headquarter of Goalpara district, Assam. It is situated at about 45 km towards the west from the district headquarter Goalpara town. The current Lakhipur town consist of ten wards. The Lakhipur Town Committee has a population of 15,633 of which 8,046 are males while 7,587 are females as per report released by Census India 2011.

Demographics
Population of Children with age of 0-6 is 2279 which is 14.58% of total population of Lakhipur (TC). In Lakhipur Town Committee, Female Sex Ratio is of 943 against state average of 958. Moreover, Child Sex Ratio in Lakhipur is around 1013 compared to Assam state average of 962. Literacy rate of Lakhipur city is 76.43% higher than state average of 72.19%. In Lakhipur, Male literacy is around 81.62% while female literacy rate is 70.85%

Religion

Official Language 
Assamese and  English Language is used for and official purpose.

Climate 
Climate of Lakhipur is significant for excessive humidity, heat during summer becomes unbearable. Mostly after every hot day, there is huge possibility of rain in the evening. During rainy season, the air is surcharged with moisture and rainfall is extremely heavy. The winter is not so cold and the temperature dips to a minimum of around 12-13 degree Celsius. The rainy season starts early and continues up to October. The early monsoon is characterised by hailstorms.

Lakhipur Municipal Board 
Lakhipur town is divided into 10 wards. Lakhipur municipal board has total administration over 2,927 houses to which it supplies basic amenities like water and sewerage. It is also authorized to build roads within municipal board limits and impose taxes on properties coming under its jurisdiction.

Politics 
Lakhipur is a part of West Goalpara and Jaleswar Constituencyin the assembly elections. Further it is a part of the Dhubri constituency for the general elections.

Lakhipur Sub-Division 
Lakhipur sub-division was declared on 26 January 2016 by the chief minister of the state Tarun Gogoi

. Lakhipur is connected to Jaleswar via road and further connected to Dhubri via river route. A number of villages namely Jaleswar, Chunari lies on the surroundings of this sub-division. Lakhipur is connected to the district headquarters Goalpara via two roads, one passing through Ambari and the other passing through Baida, Rongsai.

The town is in the developing phase and has basic medical facilities provided by the Lakhipur Primary Health Centre. One of the oldest schools is the Lakhipur Higher Secondary School. The school is located in the heart of the town and has been providing the basic education since the British ages. The town has also got a number of private schools and government schools around. Lakhipur College is the only college in the town and it provides the students of the town with an opportunity to complete graduation in the field of Arts.

The Lakhipur Police station is also dated back to 1911 A.D. and has been supervising in maintaining peace around the town.

Notable People
 Nagendra Narayan Choudhury was an Assamese short story writer and essayists from Assam.

References

Cities and towns in Goalpara district